Aliciidae is a family of sea anemones, comprising the following genera:
 Alicia Johnson, 1861
 Cradactis McMurrich, 1893
 Lebrunia Duchassaing de Fonbressin & Michelotti, 1860
 Phyllodiscus Kwietniewski, 1897
 Triactis Klunzinger, 1877

References

External links

 
Metridioidea
Cnidarian families